At Daggers Drawn is the debut album of American metalcore band Sea of Treachery, released on April 29, 2008, through Sumerian Records. The title of the album comes from the band's old name, before breaking up, regrouping, and changing labels.

Track listing

Personnel 
Sea of Treachery
 Alex Huffman - lead vocals
 Jonas Ladekjaer - lead guitar, keyboards, programming, clean vocals
 Cory Knight - guitars
 Jon Wells - bass, backing vocals
 Tommy Dalhover - drums, backing vocals

Additional musicians
 Mike Dalhover - vocals, guitars, programming
 Cory Baker - drums
 Corey Howell - bass, backing vocals
 Joey Sturgis - keys, producer, engineer, mixer
 Qbert R. Seiter -Sousaphone, Harmonica, Ocarina

References 

2008 albums
Sea of Treachery albums
Sumerian Records albums
Albums produced by Joey Sturgis